Loch Buidhe (from the Gaelic for yellow loch) may refer to a number of lochs in Scotland:
Loch Buidhe, Bonar Bridge, Sutherland
Loch Buidhe, Tongue, Sutherland
Loch Buidhe, Altnaharra, Sutherland
Loch Buidhe, Rannoch Moor
Loch Buidhe, Skye
Loch Buidhe, Glen Muick, Aberdeenshire

See also
Loch Buie, sea loch south of Mull
Lochbuie, Mull (a settlement next to the loch)
Lochbuie, Colorado, United States
, a Caledonian Macbrayne ferry